The U.S. state of New Jersey is home to significant and growing numbers of people of Latino and Hispanic descent. who in 2018 represented a Census- estimated 20.4% of the state's total population (nearly 1.8 million). New Jersey's Latino population comprises substantial concentrations of Dominican Americans, Puerto Rican Americans, Cuban Americans, Mexican Americans, Central Americans, Peruvian Americans, Colombian Americans, and Ecuadorian Americans. New Jersey is also home to a large Brazilian American and Portuguese-speaking population. 

The state has multiple municipalities with Hispanic-majority populations. Latinos and Hispanics form one-third of the population in the largest city, Newark settling in the Forest Hill, Broadway and Mount Pleasant neighborhoods which comprise mostly of Puerto Ricans and Dominicans. The northern part of Hudson County has been nicknamed Havana on the Hudson for the large number of Cuban exiles and émigrés living there. Little Lima, in Paterson, is the largest Peruvian enclave outside of South America. 

Many Latino and Hispanic people have been elected to public office in New Jersey, at both the state and local levels.

Places and populations
Municipalities with majority Hispanic populations are: as of the 2010 United States Census.

Places with over 100,000 people
Elizabeth (59.5%)
Paterson (57.6%), which includes Little Lima and La Ventiuno

Places with between 25,000 and 100,000 people
North Bergen (68.4%)
 Newark  (33.83%)
Passaic (71.0%)
Perth Amboy (78.1%)
Union City (84.7%)
West New York (78.1%)

Places with between 10,000 and 25,000 people
Dover (69.4%)
Fairview (54.6%)
Guttenberg (64.8%)

Places with fewer than 10,000 people
East Newark (61.4%)
Prospect Park (52.1%)
Victory Gardens (63.0%)

Center for Hispanic Policy, Research and Development 
The New Jersey Department of Community Affairs Center for Hispanic Policy, Research and Development is designed to empower the Hispanic community of New Jersey by administering grant dollars and providing other assistance to Hispanic community-based organizations, creating training and employment opportunities for Hispanic college interns, conducting and supporting research on New Jersey's Hispanic community, and ensuring Hispanic access to services and programs.

Public officeholders
There are officeholders of Latino background throughout the state.

Statewide
Esther Salas, federal district judge for the United States District Court for the District of New Jersey
Faustino J. Fernandez-Vina,  Associate Justice New Jersey Supreme Court
Roberto A. Rivera-Soto, Associate Justice New Jersey Supreme Court

US Congress

Bob Menendez, United States Senator
Albio Sires, Member of the United States House of Representatives 13th congressional district

State Legislators
Marlene Caride (1963), 36th Legislative District.
Gabriela M. Mosquera, State Assemblywoman, 4th Legislative District
Nilsa Cruz-Perez, State Senator, 5th District

Annette Quijano, State Assemblywomen 20th Legislative District

Teresa Ruiz, State Senator, 29th Legislative District
Eliana Pintor Marin, State Assemblywomen 29th Legislative District
Vincent Prieto, State Assemblyman 32nd legislative district, Speaker of Assembly
Angelica M. Jimenez, State Assemblywomen 32nd Legislative District
Ruben J. Ramos, State Assemblyman, 33rd legislative district
Caridad Rodriguez, State Assemblywoman 33rd Legislative District
Nellie Pou, State Senator, 35th Legislative District
Kristin Corrado, State Senator, 40th Legislative District

Hudson 

Eliu Rivera, Freeholder District 4 
Rudy Garcia, appointed mayor of Union City

Newark

The percentage of Latinos in Newark, the most populous city in New Jersey, grew considerably between 1980 and 2010, from 18.6% to 33.8%;  that of blacks has slightly decreased from 58.2% to 52.4%.  Hispanics or Latinos of any race were 33.83% (93,746) or one-third of the population, of which 13% of the total population was Puerto Rican. While municipal elections have seen black-Latino coalitions, voting tends to remain racially polarized.
Luis A. Quintana
Teresa Ruiz

Passaic
Hector Carlos Lora
Jose "Joey" Torres
Julio Tavarez, Councilmember representing 5th Ward in the City of Paterson, New Jersey
Bernice Toledo, Passaic County Surrogate Court Judge and New Jersey State Superior Court Deputy Clerk. Elected in 2011. Re-elected in 2016.

Bergen
Carlos Rendo, Mayor of Woodcliff Lake
Anthony R. Suarez, served as Mayor of Ridgefield, New Jersey

Middlesex
Joseph Vas
Wilda Diaz

Union
 Angel Estrada
Annette Quijano

South Jersey
Nilsa Cruz-Perez

Carmen G. Rodriguez, Camden County Freeholder

Sports and arts

Carol-Lynn Parente, executive producer of Sesame Street (Puerto Rican-American)
Franck de Las Mercedes, visual artist (Nicaraguan American)
Tab Ramos, US national soccer team player (Uruguayan American)

See also

Puerto Ricans in New York City
Puerto Ricans in Philadelphia

References

Further reading

A partnership to help Latino-owned businesses blossoms in N.J.

Hudson County, New Jersey
Ethnic groups in Newark, New Jersey
Paterson, New Jersey
North Hudson, New Jersey
Ethnic enclaves in New Jersey
 
Hispanic and Latino American history of New Jersey